Hang Chat is a district (amphoe) in the western part of Lampang province, northern Thailand.

Geography
Neighboring districts are (from the northeast clockwise): Mueang Lampang, Ko Kha, Soem Ngam of Lampang Province and Mae Tha of Lamphun province. The Khun Tan Range stretches from north to south along the district.

History

Originally named Hang Sat (หางสัตว์, 'animal tail'), it was renamed Hang Chat (ห้างฉัตร, 'arch under royal umbrella') in 1940.

Administration
The district is divided into seven sub-districts (tambons), which are further subdivided into 73 villages (mubans). Hang Chat is a township (thesaban tambon) which covers parts of tambon Hang Chat. There are a further seven tambon administrative organizations (TAO).

See also
 National Elephant Institute

References

External links
amphoe.com

Hang Chat